"Good Old Rock 'n' Roll", also known as "The Dave Clark Play Good Old Rock 'n' Roll", is a medley by British band the Dave Clark Five, released as a single in November 1969. It was a top-ten hit in the UK, peaking at number 7 on the Singles Chart in January 1970.

Medley 
The A-side comprises seven songs: "Good Old Rock 'n' Roll", originally by Cat Mother & the All Night Newsboys; "Sweet Little Sixteen", originally by Chuck Berry; "Long Tall Sally", originally by Little Richard; "Chantilly Lace", originally by the Big Bopper; "Whole Lotta Shakin' Goin' On", best known for the version by Jerry Lee Lewis; "Blue Suede Shoes", originally by Carl Perkins; and "Lucille", originally by Little Richard. 

The B-side comprises two songs, "Reelin' and Rockin'" and "Memphis Tennessee", both originally by Chuck Berry. 

The single had audience screams dubbed in and the album version of the A-side was over half the time shorter. In the US, a single was also released as "Good Old Rock 'n' Roll". However, this single is equivalent to the follow-up medley "More Good Old Rock 'n' Roll".

Reception 
Reviewing for New Musical Express, Derek Johnson wrote that the single is not the "official follow-up to "Put a Little Love in Your Heart" – but a special 'bonus' release". He described it as a "great Christmas party disc for the young-at-heart", but that it "would have been better without the dubbed-in audience screams".

Personnel 
 Dave Clark – drums
 Mike Smith – vocals, piano, organ
 Lenny Davidson – guitar
 Rick Huxley – guitar, harmonica
 Denis Payton – saxophone

Charts

References 

1969 songs
1969 singles
The Dave Clark Five songs
Columbia Graphophone Company singles